Rainbow is a lost 1921 silent film drama directed by Edward José and starring Alice Calhoun. It was produced and distributed by the Vitagraph Company of America.

Cast
Alice Calhoun - Rainbow Halliday
Jack Roach - George Standish
William J. Gross - Shang Jordan
Charles Kent - Andy MacTavish
Tom O'Malley - Denny Farrell
George Lessey - Rufus Halliday
Cecil Kern - Estelle Jackson
Tammany Young - Kid Short
Ivan Christy - Joe Sheady

References

External links
 Rainbow at IMDb.com
lantern slide

1921 films
Lost American films
American silent feature films
Films directed by Edward José
Vitagraph Studios films
American black-and-white films
Silent American drama films
1921 drama films
1921 lost films
Lost drama films
1920s American films